Orkestar RTW is a five-piece band based in Seattle, Washington that started in 1987 as the house band for the Radost Folk Ensemble.  Named in the tradition of post-World War II Balkan radio and television house bands (such as Orkestar Radio-Televizije Beograd), Orkestar RTW (Radio-Televizije Washington) plays the music of those bands, primarily traditional and folk music from the countries of Bulgaria, Macedonia, and Serbia.

Orkestar RTW appears on the Radost Folk Ensemble album Heirloom available from http://www.radost.org/RadostCD

Members
 Ronald Long — accordion
 Teodora Dimitrova — tambura, vocals
 Jana Rickel — Bass, vocals
 Steve Shadle — clarinet, vocals
 Tim McCormack — tapan, tarabuka

Discography
Heirloom (2001)
Orkestar RTW (2020)

External links
Orkestar RTW's website

Musical groups from Washington (state)